Aileen Wuornos: American Boogeywoman is a 2021 American horror thriller film written and directed by Daniel Farrands. It shows a fictionalized version of the early life of serial killer Aileen Wuornos, with some real facts from her biography. It stars Peyton List as Wuornos, supporting cast includes Tobin Bell, Lydia Hearst, Nick Vallelonga, Swen Temmel, and Andrew Biernat.

The film was released as Video-on-demand on October 8, 2021, and on DVD on October 15, 2021, via Dark Star Pictures.

Premise
The film details the early life of Aileen Wuornos in 1976 when she marries wealthy yacht club commodore Lewis Fell, only to inflict mayhem within her new family and Florida's high society.

Cast

 Peyton List as Aileen Wuornos
 Tobin Bell as Lewis Fell, Wuornos' husband
 Lydia Hearst as Jennifer Fell
 Nick Vallelonga as Victor Miller
 Swen Temmel as Grady Miller
 Andrew Biernat as Mitch Miller
 Meadow Williams as Diane Pittman
 Joseph Schwartz as Keith
 Ashley Atwood as older Aileen
 Hamish Sturgeon as Peter

Production
In March 2021, it was announced that Voltage Pictures acquired distribution rights to the film. Daniel Farrands, who directed the films Ted Bundy: American Boogeyman and The Haunting of Sharon Tate, became the project's director; Peyton List was cast in the lead role of a young Wuornos.

Release and reception

Release
The film was scheduled for a theatrical release in the United States on September 20, 2021, by Fathom Events, but the release was canceled. 

The film was released as Video-on-demand on October 8, 2021, and on DVD on October 15, 2021, via Dark Star Pictures. It was shown at the Screamfest Horror Film Festival on October 13, 2021.

Critical reception
On Rotten Tomatoes, the film has a rating of 20%, based on 5 reviews, with an average rating of 3.1/10. Brian Orndorf of Blu-ray.com gave the film 2 stars out of 10: "It’s crude exploitation from a one-note helmer who keeps trying to make his mark as some type of master of true crime fiction [...] This is really just horrible B-moviemaking."

See also
 Ted Bundy: American Boogeyman

References

External links
 
 

2020s English-language films
2020s American films
2020s serial killer films
2021 films
2021 horror thriller films
2021 crime thriller films
American horror thriller films
American crime thriller films
American biographical films
American serial killer films
Biographical films about serial killers
Horror films based on actual events
Crime films based on actual events
Films directed by Daniel Farrands
Cultural depictions of Aileen Wuornos
Films about Aileen Wuornos
Films about prostitution in the United States
Films about capital punishment
Girls with guns films
Films set in 1976